Antonio Campi (c. 1522 – 1587) was an Italian painter of the Renaissance.

He was born in Cremona. His style merges Lombard with Mannerist styles. In Cremona, his extended family was the foundation of the Cremonese school of painting. Giulio Campi and Antonio were reportedly half-brothers, while Vincenzo Campi was a full brother. Bernardino Campi may have been a relative. All were active as painters. Among Antonio's pupils are Galeazzo Ghidoni, Ippolito Storto, Giovanni Battista Belliboni, and Giovanni Paolo Fondulo.

Partial anthology of works
The Mystery of the Passion of Christ, 
Gaius Mucius Scaevola (drawing of Roman voluntarily placing hand into fire),
 Virgin and Child with Saints
 Saint Jerolamus (San Gerolamo) (1563)
 The Martyrdom of Saint Lawrence (1581)
 Nude Woman (drawing)
 Studies of an Old Woman's Face and a Leg (drawing)
 Francesco Sfondrati (drawing)

References

Roberto Longhi, Un “San Sebastiano” di Antonio Campi, in “Paragone”, 87, 1957, pp. 66–67.
Birgit Shell, Antonio Campi, Harvard University, 1978.
G. Bora, in I Campi. Cultura artistica cremonese del 500, edited by M. Gregori, Milano, 1985, pp. 181–196

Marco Tanzi, Cremona 1560-1570: novità sui Campi, in “Bollettino d’Arte”, 83, 1994, tav. II.
Marco Tanzi, I Campi, 5 Continents Editions, 2004.
Marco Tanzi, Un San Girolamo di Antonio Campi, Altomani & Sons ed., Milano, 2008.

External links
Campi's illustrations for Cremona fidelissima

1520s births
1587 deaths
16th-century Italian painters
Italian male painters
Painters from Cremona
Renaissance painters